Czarne Wielkie  is a village in the administrative district of Gmina Czaplinek, within Drawsko County, West Pomeranian Voivodeship, in north-western Poland.

A historic stone church of the Sacred Heart of Jesus is located in Czarne Wielkie.

References

Czarne Wielkie